Marlon Bastardo (born 18 February 1990) is a Venezuelan footballer currently playing for Universidad de Los Andes. His playing position is right-back.

References

External links
 

1990 births
Living people
Footballers from Caracas
Venezuelan footballers
A.C.C.D. Mineros de Guayana players
Estudiantes de Mérida players
Caracas FC players
Real Esppor Club players
Association football defenders
21st-century Venezuelan people